Ham Hill could refer to:

 Ham Hill, Somerset  SSSI, Country Park and Local landmark to Yeovil 
  
 Ham Hill Hillfort
 Ham Hill SSSI, Wiltshire

There is also a lesser known area to the south of Snodland, Kent that is called Ham Hill. It has always played 'second fiddle' to the larger town of Snodland, which has absorbed Ham Hill into itself, but still keeps the name as a reference.